This is a list of characters throughout the Japanese tokusatsu series .

DenLiner crew
Kamen Rider Den-O fights against the Imagin with the aid of his partners.

Ryotaro Nogami
 is a very unlucky young man. When he first appears, he managed to lodge himself on his bike in a tall tree, due to his horrific streak of bad luck. But though jinxed, Ryotaro keeps looking on the bright side. He also keeps his name tag in his wallet so it can be returned to him when it is stolen.

Due to Ryotaro’s lack of combat experience, he allows the Taros to possess him and assume more combat-oriented forms.

Hana/Kohana
 is a Singularity Point and the first DenLiner passenger Ryotaro met, convincing him to become a Kamen Rider while explaining the uses of the Rider Tickets and the Rider Pass. She said that she fights so that she can protect and preserve the flow of time from the Imagin, and she made a contract with the DenLiner's Owner to do so. She originates from a future destroyed by Imagin chaos, still existing because of her status as a Singularity Point. With no timeline to call her home, Hana is filled with malice and spite towards the Imagin, making her capable of subduing the Tarōs when they get out of line, especially Momotaros with a simple punch to the head with force equal to a truck's. Ironically, Hana grew a soft spot for the Tarōs over the course of the series, briefly crying when Urataros, Kintaros, and Ryutaros disappear, though she refuses to admit it. Hana usually worries and looks after Ryotaro, treating him like a younger brother. Over time, the tracks that represent Hana's future are being recreated, resulting with Hana turns back into a child form. In the finale, she is revealed as the daughter of Airi and Sakurai (thus being the niece of Ryotaro), the true key to the Junction Point and Kai's downfall as her future connects to the present. However, as her place in time is yet to be restored, Kohana lives on the DenLiner to await for her time. She becomes a member of the DenLiner Police at one time, aiding Kazuya Suzuki by taking out Kuroki's men singlehanded.

Naomi
 is the waitress of the DenLiner's dining car, the setting of nearly all of the action aboard the Den Liner. Despite her efforts, she usually serves poorly made coffee (she once put wasabi in the coffee as an experiment), though the Imagin cannot resist it. She is extremely hyper and does not get surprised easily, sticking to her belief of making only coffee. She is good friends with the Tarōs Imagin and is usually seen playing with Ryutaros. During the series finale, Naomi takes the Den Liner back from the New Mole Imagin and uses it to go into the past to retrieve Urataros, Kintaros, and Sieg for the final battle with Kai's army of Imagin.

Owner
The  of the DenLiner is Hana's serious yet eccentric contractor, with a habit of speaking in complex riddles when it comes to the nature of time.  He states that only those with a "Pass" are able to ride the DenLiner and, with it, transcend time itself. Also, as the DenLiner's owner, he cannot stand fighting in his train and any who would dare alter the flow of time. For either category, Owner possesses Passage Denial tickets, which are able to leave unwanted passengers stranded in the middle of time unless they have tickets. He has great knowledge of how time progresses and points out that sometimes the most minor of changes will not affect the future. No one knows his actual name and just call him "Owner".

He also happens to be a Singularity Point as he displays immunity against Ryutaros's ability to control people, even returning a similar tactic against Ryutaros himself. He is able to outrun the DenLiner and held a Master Pass until Gaoh took it from him. Owner enjoys eating various dishes that have a flag placed in the middle of them. Though the two look identical, with the Station Master wearing in white uniform and having effeminate mannerisms, Owner explains that the resemblance is just everyone else's imagination. The Station Master recently gave Owner a set of strangely designed golden spoons, the legendary God Spoon collection. Knowing that it would be the last time before facing him again with the final battle against Kai about to begin, Owner finally beats the Station Master with the flag barely falling over. In Climax Deka, Owner is robbed of the spare Den-O Pass he owns during his training, setting up the DenLiner Police with himself as Chief Inspector. He carries a spare DenGasher that he uses to calm people down by shooting his trademark flags as tranquilizers.

Momotaros
Momotaros blames Ryotaro for his oni-like form, though it matches his personality, best described as hot blooded, arrogant, and comedic, serving as a foil to Ryotaro's own shy and cowardly personality. In fact, Momotaros is more interested in fighting than carrying out the Imagin's goal. Unfortunately, he is constantly beaten by Hana when he gets Ryotaro into trouble. He also demands that he is treated better than the other Imagin as he contracted Ryotaro first.

During the events of OOO, Den-O, All Riders: Let's Go Kamen Riders, Momotaros assumed both the forms of the Momotaken for New Den-O to use and then the Imagin Medal for Kamen Rider OOO to use to assume Tamashii Combo. During Kamen Rider × Super Sentai: Ultra Super Hero Taisen, Momotaros temporarily assumes the form of the pink-colored , a hybrid of Momorenger and the Double Riders, once he and his team prevail in the Game World's Ultra Super Hero Taisen tournament. In this form, he rides the DenLiner against the Xevious fleet.

Urataros
 is a smooth-talking sea turtle-like Imagin armed with the  who possesses Ryotaro with full knowledge that he is a Singularity Point, which allows him to have more freedom than granting the wish of anyone else. Urataros is a casanova with a very convincing personality, owning the ability to convince almost anyone by speaking to them, with Ryotaro the only one who trusts him and lets him stay as he sees he has a good heart. Urataros, however, later says that he lies simply for the sake of lying and seems quite irritated that Ryotaro is "trivializing his lies." He sarcastically calls Momotaros his .

Kintaros
He has a habit of popping his neck every time he begins and ends a battle, as well having  as a battlecry. Kintaros originally possessed a man named Masaru Honjō, before joining Ryotaro, later fulfilling his contract and the others' by consequence.

Ryutaros
 is the childish dragon-like Imagin armed with the  who had been lying dormant in Ryotaro until being awakened by Issē Miura's super counseling. He possesses Ryotaro so that he could be the conductor of the DenLiner, seeking to destroy Ryotaro to achieve his goal as part of his deal with Kai. However, Ryutaros refuses to carry out the deed due to his feelings for Airi. He also has both a love for break dancing, animals, and coloring, also, possessing Kai's ability to control people by snapping his fingers.

Sieg
 is a swan-based Imagin that first opens a contract with a newborn human infant. He is brought onto the DenLiner by Ryutaros because of his love for animals. He soon possesses Ryotaro and tries to return the infant he had possessed while the baby is still in his pregnant mother. He soon begins to deteriorate because the baby does not have enough memory for him to continue to exist, but it is then revealed that he had actually opened a contract with the child's mother Shiori Takayama to keep her son Yūsuke safe. He leaves the DenLiner and lives in the year 1997, the date of Shiori's fondest memory, her wedding day. But Sieg offers his aid to Ryotaro in a few occasions, enabling Den-O to assume .

Milk Dipper regulars
The  is a library and café run by Airi, as well as the home of the Nogami family. Most of her customers are young men who all have a crush on Airi, often leaving her a multitude of gifts that, in her ignorance, Airi leaves in the lost and found for the café.

Airi Nogami
 is Ryotaro's elder sister and owner of the Milk Dipper that belonged to their parents. A motherly figure to her brother, she constantly tries to help Ryotaro in an attempt to find his lucky star. Originally, she was to be married to Yuto Sakurai on January 10, 2007, pregnant with their unborn child who is the Junction Point. However, Kai's intent to kill them to destroy the Junction Point forced Airi to allow Sakurai to erase himself and their child from normal time so they can evade Kai and his Imagin army. This resulted with Airi losing all memory of her fiancé Sakurai. Although she actually goes to the place she and Sakurai spent time together, the park at Kibōgahara after being hypnotized by Miura by accident, she cannot remember much, particularly about the railway watch which is all that Sakurai left.

When she encounters Fujishiro and is kidnapped, Airi begins to clearly remember Sakurai until Yuto uses his final Zeronos Card, wiping her memories of his future self as a result. However, Airi feels that something is missing with Ryotaro hoping it means she is regaining her memory. When Yuto later uses the red sided Zeronos Card, all of his memories with Airi are burned when he assumes Zero Form for the first time. But eventually, when Ryotaro meets Airi's past self, she is revealed to have known about Sakurai obtaining the ZeroLiner and the identity of the Junction Point: their daughter Hana.

In the series finale, Airi regains her memories of Sakurai as they meet one final time before he fades from existence, though she is confident that they will meet again in the near future. During Climax Deka, Airi meets Ryutaros face to face, giving him a treat which he bashfully takes. Later, during the events of Episode Red: Zero no Star Twinkle, Airi meets with Yuto and now knows that he is her lover's past self. Though she believes that their future can no longer be with Yuto as he is, she realizes that she may be wrong after he saves her and shows her the nighttime sky on their way home.

Seigi Ozaki
 is the journalist who is the chief editor of a short-lived magazine where Ryotaro worked. He is always looking for a new good story to restore his magazine, sometimes revealing Imagin attacks to Ryotaro this way. He is a regular customer at the Milk Dipper and is trying to court Airi. Ozaki also has a habit of flirting with other women since first grade, despite the fact that he focuses on Airi. During Climax Deka, Ozaki learns the truth behind Ryotaro when Airi takes him and Miura into the DenLiner.

Issē Miura
 is a self-styled super counselor. He is a regular customer at Milk Dipper and is also trying to court Airi, but he is more introverted than Seigi in this regard. He believes that Ryotaro is possessed by evil spirits after witnessing the "confrontation" between Momotaros and Urataros. Unknowingly, his attempt to hypnotize Ryotaro in hopes of exorcising the evil spirits result in Ryutaros revealing himself. As a result, Miura is the only one who is somewhat aware of the Tarōs' possessions, though no one believes him until Climax Deka, where Airi brings him to the DenLiner to see Ryotaro.

ZeroLiner crew
It was supposedly destroyed with a previous timeline as was its previous owner. According to Yuto, he has been lent the ZeroLiner from its former owner and was given the Zeronos powers as a result.

Yuto Sakurai
 is a man that revealed himself to Ryotaro and Hana following the defeat of the Wolf Imagin. He is the past version of Airi's fiancé, but acts nothing like him. Revealing himself as a Kamen Rider, Yuto advises Ryotaro not to go looking for his future self as it would tamper with time, believing that protecting the flow of time is not the same as saving lives, and thus believes Ryotaro is unfit to be one. However, in time, Yuto began to warm up to Ryotaro and help in any way he can. His Rider Ticket, with the image of Zeronos'  on it, is emblazoned with the date May 27, 2007 (the air date of his premiere episode).

Past Man
The  is a mysterious figure that appears in times in the past where Imagin appear after fulfilling their contracts, usually to go after him. He has a Seiko pocket watch that has the phrase "The past should give us hope" on the back etched on it. He wears a trenchcoat and many caps. When Ryotaro bumps into the "Past Man" at one point, he saw that he was the Yuto Sakurai he knew: Airi's fiancé who mysteriously disappeared and is believed to be dead. Ryotaro remembers him as a kind figure who was into astronomy and loved Airi's coffee, and as such, almost considered him family. As he is Yuto's future self, Sakurai has access to the Zeronos arsenal. Eventually, the memory of Sakurai is completely erased from mostly everyone within Ryotaro's time. This happens because Sakurai provided Deneb with the first set of Zeronos Cards Yuto uses at the cost of his future self's existence, with the final Zeronos card presented to Yuto in the final battle completely erasing him from time. Airi though is confident that her love will return to her in time.

Deneb
 is the only Imagin contracted to Kamen Rider Zeronos. He acts as a butler to Yuto Sakurai while on the ZeroLiner and is constantly the subject of his master's abuse. He is named after the star Deneb in the constellation Cygnus the Swan.

New DenLiner crew
The New DenLiner appears in Saraba Kamen Rider Den-O: Final Countdown and is the base of operations for Kamen Rider New Den-O.

Kotaro Nogami
 is the grandson of Ryotaro from the future who has the ability to transform into . In Final Countdown, he helps the DenLiner gang out when Ryotaro is captured by Shiro.

Teddy

Gaoh
 is a thief-king who targets Time Trains and a renegade Kamen Rider. Gaoh and his Imagin followers took camp at May, 2000 to await his plan to come to fruition, by sending the Molech Imagin to 2007 to set the pieces up. When the DenLiner arrives as planned, Gaoh takes it over and uses his Master Pass to enter the Sengoku Era where he manipulates Yukimura Sanada into unsealing the cave where the GaohLiner is sealed within the time of its creation. While he eventually obtains the GaohLiner and wreaks havoc upon the feudal village before heading into 1988 to erase Ryotaro for his interference, Gaoh faces Zeronos and the three other Ryotaros that were assembled for the 'Climax Scene' arrive as they destroy his followers. While Gaoh manages to defeat Zeronos and the three past Den-O's with his  finisher, the present one in Sword Form uses his Extreme Slash (special version) to trick Gaoh and wound him. Gaoh attempts to escape aboard the GaohLiner but it is destroyed by the ZeroLiner and DenLiner. Gaoh survived, but died in the final clash against Den-O Sword Form, dissolving to dust as he is 'consumed by time'.

While possessing the GaohLiner, Gaoh can control it from its crocodile-shaped  car using the  motorcycle.

Kai
 is an antagonist of the series and is a Singularity Point from the future who is the mastermind behind the Imagin attacks, psychically giving them the orders to destroy the key to the Junction Point to ensure the future of the Imagin. To pick ideal dates to send Imagin back to, Kai uses a black page-a-day calendar where he has several hosts' memories and his own to pick from. To find these dates, he can look into human minds for strong memories much like the Imagin. When his own memories are used, a past incarnation of Kai appears in the past only to dissolve into a pile of sand.

Kai is also capable of opening up portals through time and travel through it without the use of a time-traveling train, and through this ability can also release blasts of energy capable of erasing everything but himself from time and space. After mentioning how he feels about an event, he says . He often has an emotionless or angry expression on his face when he says this. Kai also has psychic abilities akin to Ryutaros's, having the ability to control people as well as summon up a small troupe of break dancers. Despite his villainous methods, Kai believes that his goal of saving the Imagin's future is altruistic, having true feelings for their kind.

He originally believes that the key to the Junction Point is the elder Yuto Sakurai, traveling back in time to January 10, 2007, to kill him. However, when the changes to the timeline from Sakurai's death are undone, he believes that Den-O is the culprit, and sends the Imagin Ryutaros to the DenLiner with a permanent ticket with the charge of killing Ryotaro. When Ryutaros refuses to follow through with his mission, Kai reveals himself and tries to get Ryutaros to sabotage the ZeroLiner, taking the DenLiner and Den-O Belt out of commission. After this fails, he notices that Yuto does not protect his future self from harm in the past, but rather protects Ryotaro.

After questioning him, Kai discovers that Airi is the one being protected, and Kai sends an army of Imagin to kill her. As Airi's memory loss and other quirks confound him, Kai creates the Death Imagin from all his remaining memories and will. Kai's army destroys the city until he finally discovers that the key to the Junction Point is not Sakurai or Airi but rather their child, the Singularity Point Hana. After Den-O, Zeronos, and their Imagin partners protect Hana by destroying the Death Imagin, all of Kai's memories are used up and he dissolves away into sand, taking all of the Imagin except for the Tarōs, Deneb, Sieg, and a few other isolated cases with him.

Imagin
 are sand-based beings from a possible future who have lost their physical forms due to an event that erased their timeline, becoming dependent on memories to survive. Able to travel through time, Imagin possess humans and used an established contract to assume a physical form based from key fictional characters from the host's memory. A large majority of Imagin serve Kai, arriving to the year 2007 to find weak-hearted humans to form contracts where they fulfill the hosts' desire at any cost. But as the Imagin as a whole have various quirks, some among them decided to work against Kai and act on their own whims

Due to their physiology, some Imagin possess the ability to create offshoots from their being in the form of clone siblings with slight physical and mental differences. Some Imagin, upon death, can reform their bodies into large and destructively feral monsters called  which come in three varieties: the bird-like , the eel-like
, and the behemoth-like . In some cases, an Imagin can spawn multiple Gigandeaths from their being.

Kai's Imagin
Though the Wolf Imagin succeeds in traveling back to April 7, 2004, Den-O Gun Form's interference prevented him from completing his mission. Losing it after being stuck for a day in the past with no new information from Kai of Sakurai's location, the Wolf Imagin decides to resort in destroying everything to fulfill his mission before finally being destroyed by Den-O Sword Form. The Wolf Imagin makes return appears in the Den-O Hyper Battle Video and the Imagin Anime 2 shorts.
The first set of Mole Imagin that Den-O encountered, having established a contract with  who used him to travel to June 16, 2000, consisted of a serious "Ax-Hand" Mole and his younger clone brothers: A crazed Claw-Hand and an effeminate Drill-Hand. While the Ax-Hand Mole was destroyed by Zeronos Zero Form, his brothers were both destroyed by Den-O when he first assumed Liner Form. During the finale, Kai created an army of black-vested  who are armed with numerous other weapons for hands.
The Leo Imagin later acts on Kai's orders to travel through his host to January 19, 2006 where he is destroyed by Den-O Liner Form using the DenKamen Sword's RyuGun mode.
While he overpowered the Kamen Riders, the Death Imagin is eventually destroyed by Den-O Sword Form and the combined energies of all the good Imagin.

Gaoh's Imagin
 An Imagin based on the Kenyan story , the Molech Imagin took robber  as a host and using him to travel back to May 8, 2000 to serve as a distraction for Gaoh to take the Den-Liner and ends up being destroyed by Den-O. Another Molech Imagin appears among Kai's Imagin Army.
He then fulfilled his contract with Ike by retrieving the jewels he stole. The Bloodsucker Imagin travels to May 20, 2000 where he is destroyed by Den-O in Climax Form.
 An Imagin based on the Thai story , the Cobra Imagin aids Gaoh and nearly kills Ryotaro in the Edo era when Sieg takes over and assumes Wing Form to easily dispatch the Imagin. Multiple Cobra Imagin later appear among Kai's Imagin Army.
 An Imagin based on the Mexican story , the Salamander Imagin aids Gaoh in unearthing the GaohLiner while possessing one of the Sanada Ten Braves and is later destroyed during the Climax Scene against an incarnation of Den-O Rod Form.
 An Imagin based on the story , the Gecko Imagin aids Gaoh before being later destroyed during the Climax Scene against an incarnation of Den-O Gun Form. Multiple Gecko Imagin later appear aiding Kai and later Shiro.
 An Imagin based on the story , the Newt Imagin aids Gaoh before being later destroyed during the Climax Scene against an incarnation of Den-O Axe Form. Multiple Newt Imagin later appear aiding Kai and later Shiro.

Negataros
An evil version of Momotaros,  is the villain of Climax Deka. Seeking to restore the Imagines' timeline following Kai's destruction, supported by the Pink Rabbit Imagin and the Clown Imagin, Negataros recruits various mobsters and Fangires to achieve his goals. Negataros's scheme ultimately fails due to both Yuto as an inside man in his organization and Den-O being aided by Kamen Rider Kiva.

Negataros is voiced by

Eve
The antagonist of Episode Yellow in the Cho-Den-O Trilogy, his infinite knowledge allowing him to devise form counter to an attack,  is an artificial Doberman Pinscher Imagin created by the Time Police that was built into a Rider Pass used by his partner Reiji Kurosaki to become Kamen Rider G Den-O. While emotionless like Kurosaki, Eve is obsessed with duty and delivering judgement on those the Time Police deemed criminals. But when Kurosaki starts showing emotion as a result of Daiki Kaito manipulating time to help the man cope with his past while escaping justice, Eve deems humanity too illogical to exist and personally becomes G Den-O to execute everyone. Eve ends up destroyed by Diend Complete Form and Den-O Climax Form, with the G Den-O system destroyed in the process.

Eve is voiced by

Other Imagin
After being knocked away by Zeronos, the Piggies Imagin is cut to pieces by Den-O Climax Form.
The Mantis Imagin failed in her task when New Den-O destroys her.

References 

Den-O
Kamen Rider Den-O